The 6th National Film Awards, then known as State Awards for Films, presented by Ministry of Information and Broadcasting, India to felicitate the best of Indian Cinema released in the year 1958. Ceremony took place at Vigyan Bhavan, New Delhi on 28 April 1959 and awards were given by then President of India, Dr. Rajendra Prasad.

Awards 

Awards were divided into feature films and non-feature films.

President's Gold Medal for the All India Best Feature Film is now better known as National Film Award for Best Feature Film, whereas President's Gold Medal for the Best Documentary Film is analogous to today's National Film Award for Best Non-Feature Film. For children's films, Prime Minister's Gold Medal is now given as National Film Award for Best Children's Film. At the regional level, President's Silver Medal for Best Feature Film is now given as National Film Award for Best Feature Film in a particular language. Certificate of Merit in all the categories is discontinued over the years.

Feature films 

Feature films were awarded at All India as well as regional level. For the 6th National Film Awards, in this category, two Bengali films Sagar Sangamey and Jalsaghar along with a Kannada film School Master won maximum number of awards (two), with Sagar Sangamey also winning the President's Gold Medal for the All India Best Feature Film. Following were the awards given:

All India Award 

Following were the awards given in each category:

Regional Award 

The awards were given to the best films made in the regional languages of India. For 6th National Film Awards, President's Silver Medal for Best Feature Film was not given in Malayalam, Marathi and Tamil language; instead Certificate of Merit was awarded in each particular language.

Non-Feature films 

Non-feature film awards were given for the documentaries made in the country. Following were the awards given:

Documentaries

Awards not given 

Following awards were not given as no film was found to be suitable for the award:

 Prime Minister's Gold Medal for the Best Children's Film
 President's Silver Medal for Best Feature Film in Marathi
 President's Silver Medal for Best Feature Film in Malayalam
 President's Silver Medal for Best Feature Film in Tamil

References

External links 
 National Film Awards Archives
 Official Page for Directorate of Film Festivals, India

National Film Awards (India) ceremonies
1959 in Indian cinema
1959 film awards